The Lockheed XPB-3, later designated XFM-2, (PB - Pursuit, Biplace / FM - Fighter, Multi-seat), was a proposed American heavy fighter aircraft, developed by the Lockheed Corporation during the mid-1930s. Intended as a heavy fighter and bomber destroyer for operation by the United States Army Air Corps, it failed to win a contract for construction of a prototype, the Bell YFM-1 Airacuda being preferred.

Design and development
Given the Lockheed designation Model 11, the XFM-2 was developed in response to a United States Army Air Corps requirement for a heavy, twin-engined "bomber destroyer". Originally designated XPB-3 in the 'pursuit, biplace' category, it was redesignated 'XFM-2', for 'fighter, multiplace' early in development. Intended to be powered by two Allison V-1710 supercharged engines, the aircraft was designed for an armament of two 37mm cannon, one mounted in a nose turret and the other in a dorsal turret behind the cockpit.

The XFM-2 featured a tricycle landing gear configuration, and was a mid-wing monoplane of nearly medium bomber size. The empennage featured a twin-tail arrangement. Although the XFM-2 design was evaluated favorably by the Air Corps, the Bell YFM-1 Airacuda was selected to fill the bomber destroyer requirement, and further work on the XFM-2 was abandoned.

See also

References

Citations

Bibliography

 
 

FM-002
Cancelled military aircraft projects of the United States
Mid-wing aircraft
Twin piston-engined tractor aircraft